Bagao is an island, which is also part of the Loyalty Islands, belonging to New Caledonia, an overseas territory of France in the Pacific Ocean.

References

Islands of New Caledonia